is a former Japanese football player.

Playing career
Yasutake was born in Fukuoka Prefecture on December 20, 1978. He joined J1 League club Sanfrecce Hiroshima from youth team in 1997. He played 2 matches in late 1997. However he could not play at all in the match in 1998 and retired end of 1998 season.

Club statistics

References

External links

biglobe.ne.jp

1978 births
Living people
Association football people from Fukuoka Prefecture
Japanese footballers
J1 League players
Sanfrecce Hiroshima players
Association football defenders